Domino Effect is the eighth studio album released by the hard rock band Gotthard.

The album peaked at #1 on the Swiss charts and was certified as Platinum for exceeding 30,000 sales.

Track listing

Domino Effect: Tour Edition

Personnel
Gotthard
Steve Lee – lead vocals
Leo Leoni – guitars and backing vocals
Freddy Scherer – guitars and backing vocals
Marc Lynn – bass
Hena Habegger – drums and percussion

Additional musician
Nicolo Fragile – keyboards

Special guests
Flavio Hochstrasser – additional backing vocals on tracks 3, 8, 11, 12, 13 and 14
Danny Lee – additional backing vocals on tracks 8, 11, 12 and 13
Ellen Ten Damme – additional backing vocals on tracks 3 and 11
Anders Wikström – additional backing vocals on track 3
Chunhe Gao – violins on track 4
Ceck Formenti – trumpet on track 4
Lino Rigamonti – accordion on track 14

Charts

Weekly charts

Year-end charts

References

2007 albums
Gotthard (band) albums
Nuclear Blast albums